Jacques Gaston Leon Jean Descatoire (28 May 1920 – 11 May 1984) was a French bobsledder who competed in the late 1940s. He finished ninth in the four-man event at the 1948 Winter Olympics in St. Moritz.

References

External links
1948 bobsleigh four-man results
Jacques Descatoire's profile at Sports Reference.com

1920 births
1984 deaths
French male bobsledders
Olympic bobsledders of France
Bobsledders at the 1948 Winter Olympics